Justice is the twelfth studio album by Japanese pop rock band Glay, released simultaneously with Guilty on January 23, 2013. It reached #1 on Oricon charts, #86 at their 2013 year-end chart and #1 at the Billboard Japan Top Albums chart. Both albums mark the second release of the band under their own label "Loversoul Music & Associates".

The album was released in two formats: a regular edition containing the CD only, and a limited edition containing the CD and a DVD with a special program called RX-72 -Justice Edition- (hosted by the band's lead guitarist Hisashi and Mogi Junichi). The program features episodes from the album recording and dialogue. There are also some tracks from their concert held at Zepp DiverCity on December 10, 2012. A similar DVD was released with Guilty.

The track "Mahiru no Tsuki no Shizukesa ni" was used as the theme song for the movie Sogen no Isu.

Track listing

 DVD features
 RX-72 -Justice Edition-
 Footage from 2012.12.10 Zepp DiverCity

References

External links
 Album profile at the Lover Soul Music & Associates's official website

2013 albums
Glay albums